Zhoř may refer to places in the Czech Republic:

Zhoř (Brno-Country District), a municipality and village in the South Moravian Region
Zhoř (Jihlava District), a municipality and village in the Vysočina Region
Zhoř (Písek District), a municipality and village in the South Bohemian Region
Zhoř (Tachov District), a municipality and village in the Plzeň Region
Zhoř u Mladé Vožice, a municipality and village in the South Bohemian Region
Zhoř u Tábora, a municipality and village in the South Bohemian Region
Zhoř, a village and part of Čechtice in the Central Bohemian Region
Zhoř, a village and part of Červené Janovice in the Central Bohemian Region
Zhoř, a village and part of Krakovec in the Central Bohemian Region
Zhoř, a village and part of Krásná Hora nad Vltavou in the Central Bohemian Region
Zhoř (Němčice), a village and part of Němčice in the Pardubice Region
Zhoř, a village and part of Pacov in the Vysočina Region
Zhoř, a village and part of Skuteč in the Pardubice Region
Zhoř, a village and part of Vilémov (Havlíčkův Brod District) in the Vysočina Region
Stránecká Zhoř, a municipality and village in the Vysočina Region
Zálesná Zhoř, a municipality and village in the South Moravian Region